Elektroprivreda Republike Srpske or Elektroprivreda RS, is a state-owned integrated power company with headquarters in Trebinje, Republika Srpska in Hercegovina.

It is the largest employer in Republika Srpska and second-largest power utility in Bosnia and Herzegovina (after Elektroprivreda Bosne i Hercegovine).

See also

 Elektroprivreda Bosne i Hercegovine
 Elektroprivreda HZ HB

References

External links
 

Electric power companies of Bosnia and Herzegovina
Companies based in Trebinje
Companies established in 2005
2005 establishments in Bosnia and Herzegovina
Economy of Republika Srpska
Organizations based in Republika Srpska
Government-owned companies of Bosnia and Herzegovina
Government-owned energy companies